Church Green may refer to:

In the United Kingdom
 Church Green, Tyne and Wear, England
 Church Green, Witney, Oxfordshire, England
 Church Green, Worcestershire, a district of Redditch
 Church Green, Devon, Devon
In the United States
 Church Green (Taunton, Massachusetts)
 Church Green Buildings Historic District, Boston, Massachusetts